Charles Crockett (December 29, 1870 – June 12, 1934) was an American character actor known for his roles in films such as Guilty Hands, The Gingham Girl, and The Princess from Hoboken.

Born in Baltimore, Maryland, on December 29, 1870, Crockett appeared in stage productions before becoming a film actor. During his career, he acted in four Western films, two comedy films, and two historical films.

Calling him "a well-known character actor", The Cincinnati Post said, "In addition to being an actor of repute, Crockett is known in studioland as 'Hollywood's Will Rogers', so famous have his many humorous after-dinner speeches become in every quarter of the studio city." Rotten Tomatoes said he "had a successful Hollywood career". The Bulletin, a publication of the American Academy of Arts and Sciences, stated Crockett was "the well known character actor of Hollywood", while The Sacramento Bee called him a "screen luminary". Crockett died on June 12, 1934, in Los Angeles, California.

Filmography
Crockett was cast in these films:

The Millionaire Cowboy as Granville Truce
Sundown as Joe Patton
The Dressmaker from Paris as Mayor
Daddy's Gone A-Hunting as Mr. Smith
Winds of Chance as Jerry
The Vanishing American as Amos Halliday
Into Her Kingdom as Senov
The Collegians as Dean Maxwell
Benson at Calford as Dean Maxwell
Fighting to Win as Dean Maxwell
Making Good as Dean Maxwell
The Last Lap as Dean Maxwell
The Princess from Hoboken as Whiskers
Arizona Bound as John Winslow
The Gingham Girl as Pat O'Day
Running Wild as Dean Maxwell
Cross Country Run as Dean Maxwell
Abraham Lincoln as Sheriff
Ex-Flame as Parson
Guilty Hands as H.G. Smith
You Can't Buy Everything as Committee Man
The Cat and the Fiddle as Rudy's Secretary

References

External links

 
 

1870 births
1934 deaths
20th-century American male actors
American male silent film actors
Male actors from Baltimore
Male actors from Los Angeles